The Virginia Senate election of 1995 was held on Tuesday, November 7.

Overall results

Election Results

See also 
 United States elections, 1995
 Virginia elections, 1995
 Virginia House of Delegates election, 1995

References 

Senate
Virginia
Virginia Senate elections